Surda (Surźı) is a rural locality (a village) in Kirzinsky Selsoviet, Karaidelsky District, Bashkortostan, Russia. The population was 115 as of 2010. There are 2 streets.

Geography 
Surda is located 94 km southwest of Karaidel (the district's administrative centre) by road. Kirzya is the nearest rural locality.

References 

Rural localities in Karaidelsky District